Planina is a small settlement in the hills north of Stična in the Municipality of Ivančna Gorica in central Slovenia. The municipality is included in the Central Slovenia Statistical Region. The entire area is part of the historical region of Lower Carniola.

References

External links

Planina on Geopedia

Populated places in the Municipality of Ivančna Gorica